Felix Dapare Dakora,  is a Ghanaian plant biologist investigating biological nitrogen fixation at the Tshwane University of Technology in South Africa. He currently serves as President of The African Academy of Sciences for the 2017–2023 terms. Dakora was awarded the UNESCO-Equatorial Guinea International Prize for Research in the Life Sciences and the African Union Kwame Nkrumah Scientific Award. Dakora is a Fellow of the Academy of Science of South Africa.

Academic career 
Dakora studied agriculture at the University of Ghana, obtaining his BSc (Hons) degree in 1977. After a year at  Ghana's Crops Research Institute, he moved to the University of Sydney, Australia, to study microbiology, obtaining an MSc degree. Returning to Nyankpala in Northern Ghana to the Savanna Agricultural Research Institute, Dakora continued researching the role of symbiotic legumes in nitrogen fixation. In 1985 Dakora moved from Ghana to Perth, Western Australia to study for a PhD in botany at  the University of Western Australia, Perth. Following the award of his PhD in 1989,  Dakora moved to the Smithsonian Institution, Washington, D.C., and later to University of California, Davis.  In 1993 Dakora became a lecturer in the botany department at the University of Cape Town.  In  2002 Dakora became professor abd executive dean of research development and technology promotion, Cape Technikon, Cape Town.  He holds  a South African Research Chair in agrochemurgy and plant symbioses at Tshwane University of Technology.

Research interests 
Dakora first studied fast‐growing bacteria from nodules of cowpea at the University of Sydney.  Throughout his career Dakora has published over 400  papers covering the roles of legume signalling molecules, and legumes and their associated microbes which fertilize crops and are tolerant of drought, acidic and salty soils and high temperatures. Dakora has also studied microbes which can help overcome micronutrient deficiency in Africa and methods of sustainable agriculture.

Awards and honours 
UNESCO-Equatorial Guinea International Prize for Research in the Life Sciences, 2012
Fellow of the African Academy of Sciences, 2014
African Union Kwame Nkrumah Continental Science Award, 2016
Elected President of the African Academy of Sciences, 2017
Fellow of The World Academy of Sciences,  2018
Foreign member of the Chinese Academy of Engineering, 2019

References

External links 
 Felix Dakora at Tshwane University of Technology

1952 births
Living people
Ghanaian scientists
Academic staff of Tshwane University of Technology
University of Western Australia alumni
University of Ghana alumni
University of Sydney alumni
TWAS fellows
Foreign members of the Chinese Academy of Engineering